Tanguy Viel (7 July 1973, Brest) is a French writer. A resident at the Villa Médicis in 2003–2004, Tanguy Viel was awarded the Prix Fénéon and the Prix littéraire de la vocation for his novel L'absolue perfection du crime. He also won the Grand prix RTL-Lire for Article 353 du Code pénal in 2017. Other Press in New York published the translation by William Rodarmor in March, 2019. La fille qu'on appelle was one of nine novels in the second selection for the 2021 Prix Goncourt.

Works 
 Novels and short stories
 1998 : Le Black Note, Paris, Éditions de Minuit 
 1999 : Cinéma, Éditions de Minuit 
 2000 : Tout s'explique: réflexions à partir d'« Explications » de Pierre Guyotat, Paris,  
 2001 : L'Absolue perfection du crime, Éditions de Minuit, Prix Fénéon and Prix littéraire de la vocation, 
 2002 : Maladie, Inventaire-Invention 
 2006 : Insoupçonnable, Éditions de Minuit 
 2009 : Paris-Brest, Éditions de Minuit 
 2009 : Cet homme-là, Paris,  
 2010 : Hitchcock par exemple, illustrations by Florent Chavouet, Editions Naïve.
 2010 : Un jour dans la vie, Lyon, published by librairie Passages
 2013 : La Disparition de Jim Sullivan, Éditions de Minuit 
 2017 : Article 353 du Code pénal (Éditions de Minuit). Translated into English as Article 353 by William Rodarmor (Other Press. New York).
 2021 : La fille qu'on appelle, Éditions de Minuit 
 Interviews
 2002 : Tanguy Viel parle des Éditions de Minuit (interviews with Amandine Riant and Marie-Thérèse Roinet), Saint-Cloud, Université de Paris X, Pôle des métiers du livre 

References

External links 
 Paris-Brest on Mediapart (10 January 2009)
 Tanguy Viel on Babelio
 Tanguy VIEL on Écritures contemporaines
 Tanguy Viel on M.E.L.
 1 TANGUY VIEL bibliography
 Tanguy Viel s'essaie au roman américain on L'Express (8 April 2013)

21st-century French non-fiction writers
Prix Fénéon winners
1973 births
Writers from Brest, France
Living people